A user error is an error made by the human user of a complex system, usually a computer system, in interacting with it. Although the term is sometimes used by human–computer interaction practitioners, the more formal human error term is used in the context of human reliability.

Related terms such as PEBMAC ("problem exists between monitor and chair"), identity error or ID-10T/1D-10T error ("idiot error"), PICNIC ("problem in chair, not in computer"), IBM error ("idiot behind machine error") and other similar phrases are also used as slang in technical circles with derogatory meaning. This usage implies a lack of computer savviness, asserting that problems arising when using a device are the fault of the user. Critics of the term argue that the problems are caused instead by poor product designs that fail to anticipate the capabilities and needs of the user.

The term can also be used for non-computer-related mistakes.

Causes 
Joel Spolsky points out that users usually do not pay full attention to the computer system while using it. He suggests compensating for this when building usable systems, thus allowing a higher percentage of users to complete tasks without errors:

Experts in interaction design such as Alan Cooper believe this concept puts blame in the wrong place, the user, instead of blaming the error-inducing design and its failure to take into account human limitations. Bruce "Tog" Tognazzini describes an anecdote of Dilbert creator Scott Adams losing a significant amount of work of comment moderation at his blog due to a poorly constructed application that conveyed a wrong mental model, even though the user took explicit care to preserve the data.

Jef Raskin advocated designing devices in ways that prevent erroneous actions. 

Don Norman suggests changing the common technical attitude towards user error:

Acronyms and other names 

Terms like PEBMAC/PEBCAK or an ID10T error are often used by tech support operators and computer experts to describe a user error as a problem that is attributed to the user's ignorance instead of a software or hardware malfunction. These phrases are used as a humorous way to describe user errors. A highly popularized example of this is a user mistaking their CD-ROM tray for a cup holder, or a user looking for the "any key".  However, any variety of stupidity or ignorance-induced problems can be described as user errors.

PEBKAC/PEBCAK/PICNIC 
Phrases used by the tech savvy to mean that a problem is caused entirely by the fault of the user include PEBKAC (an acronym for "problem exists between keyboard and chair"), PEBCAK (an alternative, but similar, acronym for "problem exists between chair and keyboard"), POBCAK (a US government/military acronym for "problem occurs between chair and keyboard"), PICNIC ("problem in chair not in computer") and EBKAC ("Error between keyboard and chair"). Another variant is PEBUAK (Problem Exists Between User and Keyboard).

In 2006, Intel began running a number of PEBCAK web-based advertisements to promote its vPro platform.

ID-10-T error 
ID-Ten-T error (also seen as ID10T and ID107) is a masked jab at the user: when ID-Ten-T is spelled out it becomes ID10T ("IDIOT").  It is also known as a "Ten-T error" or "ID:10T error". The User Friendly comic strip presented this usage in a cartoon on 11 February 1999.

In United States Navy and Army slang, the term has a similar meaning, though it is pronounced differently:
The Navy pronounces ID10T as "eye dee ten tango".
The Army instead uses the word 1D10T which it pronounces as "one delta ten tango".

In other languages 

In Swedish the phrase skit bakom spakarna ("shit behind the levers") or skit bakom styret ("shit behind steering wheel") or the abbreviation "SBS-problem" is used. A variant used in the ICT domain is skit bakom tangenterna ("shit behind the keyboard") abbreviated "SBT".

In French it is described as an "ICC" problem (interface chaise-clavier), a problem with the keyboard-chair interface, very similarly to the PEBKAC.

Better known as "Code-18".

In Portuguese it is called a "BIOS problem" (Burro Idiota Operando o Sistema), translated as "Dumb Idiot Operating the System", or USB (Utilizador Super Burro), translated as "Super Dumb User".

In German it is called a "DAU" (Dümmster anzunehmender User), literally translated as "dumbest assumed user", referring to the common engineering acronym "GAU" (Größter anzunehmender Unfall), for a maximum credible accident, or worst-case scenario.

In subcultures

The computing jargon refers to "wetware bugs" as the user is considered part of the system, in a hardware/software/wetware layering.

The automotive repair persons' version is referring to the cause of a problem as a "faulty steering actuator", "broken linkage between the seat and the steering wheel", "loose nut between the steering wheel and the seat," or more simply, "loose nut behind the wheel." Similarly, typewriter repair people used to refer to "a loose nut behind the keyboard" or a "defective keyboard controller."

The broadcast engineering or amateur radio version is referred to as a "short between the headphones". Another term used in public safety 2-way radio (i.e. police, fire, ambulance, etc.) is a "defective PTT button actuator".

Another similar term used in the United States military is "operator headspace and timing issue" or "OHT," borrowing terminology related to the operation of the M2 Browning machine gun.

"(It's a) carbon based error", indicates a user problem (as humans are a carbon-based life-form), as opposed to a silicon one.

Some support technicians refer to it as "biological interface error".

The networking administrators' version is referring to the cause of a problem as a "layer 8 issue", referring to the "user" or "political" layer on top of the 7-layer OSI model of computer networking.

In video game culture, user error is sometimes referred to as a "skill issue", often as a retort to the player complaining about the game's perceived unfairness.

See also 

 Error message
 Latent human error
 Luser – Local user, or loser
 Mode error
 RTFM
 Social engineering
 Pilot error
 Undo

References 

Computer humor
Computer jargon
In-jokes
Internet slang
Internet terminology
User errors